Carl Cheng (born 1942) is an American artist based in Santa Monica California. Since the 1960s he has released work under the name  
John Doe Co. He explains his decision to do work under the name of a company because his accountant advised him that it would be beneficial for tax reasons, and because other hi-tech companies were more likely to respond to his requests for material samples if it came on company letterhead.   He studied industrial design at UCLA in the 1960s and went on to have a multi-decade career, exhibiting internationally.

Notes

External links 
 Official John Doe Co. website

1942 births
Living people
American contemporary artists
New media artists
University of California, Los Angeles alumni